The geniculate ganglion (from Latin genu, for "knee") is a collection of pseudounipolar sensory neurons of the facial nerve located in the facial canal of the head. It receives fibers from the facial nerve. It sends fibers that supply the lacrimal glands, submandibular glands, sublingual glands, tongue, palate, pharynx, external auditory meatus, stapedius muscle, posterior belly of the digastric muscle, stylohyoid muscle, and muscles of facial expression.

The geniculate ganglion is one of several ganglia of the head and neck. Like the others, it is a bilaterally distributed structure, with each side of the face having a geniculate ganglion.

Structure 
The geniculate ganglion is located close to the internal auditory meatus. It is covered superiorly by the petrous part of the temporal bone (which is sometimes absent over the ganglion).

The geniculate ganglion receives fibers from the motor, sensory, and parasympathetic components of the facial nerve. It the contains special sensory neuronal cell bodies for taste, from fibers coming up from the tongue through the chorda tympani and from fibers coming up from the roof of the palate through the greater petrosal nerve. Sensory and parasympathetic inputs are carried into the geniculate ganglion via the nervus intermedius. Motor fibers are carried via the facial nerve proper. The greater petrosal nerve, which carries preganglionic parasympathetic fibers, emerges from the anterior aspect of the ganglion.

The motor fibers of the facial nerve proper and parasympathetic fibers to the submandibular and pterygopalatine ganglia do not synapse in the geniculate ganglion. The afferent fibers carrying pain, temperature, and touch from the posterior auricular nerve, as well as those carrying special sensory (taste) fibers from the tongue (via the chorda tympani), do not synapse in the geniculate ganglion. Instead, the cells of the geniculate ganglion relay the signal to the appropriate brainstem nucleus, much like the Dorsal root ganglion neurons relay signal to nuclei in the spinal cord.

Function 
Via the geniculate ganglion, the facial nerve (CN VII) gives 

 parasympathetic innervation to:
 the lacrimal glands.
 the submandibular glands.
 the sublingual glands.

 special sensory innervation to:
 the tongue for taste.
 general sensory innervation to:
 skin of the posterior ear
 somatic (branchial) motor innervation to:
 the palate
 the pharynx.
 the external auditory meatus
 the stapedius muscle.
 the posterior belly of the digastric muscle.
 the stylohyoid muscle.
 muscles of facial expression.

Clinical significance 
The geniculate ganglion is an important surgical landmark near the internal auditory meatus.

The geniculate ganglion may become inflamed due to viral infection by herpes zoster virus.

Additional images

See also 
Ramsay Hunt syndrome type II

References

External links 
 
 

Nervous ganglia of the head and neck
Gustatory system
Sensory ganglia